Josse De Pauw (born 15 March 1952) is a versatile Belgian actor, film director, dramatist, author and columnist. He was married to modern dance performer Fumio Ikeda for over thirty years.

Theatre

After graduating from the Royal Conservatory in Brussels De Pauw founded the mime theatre group Radeis International (1976), and after that Schaamte, the theatre company that would be the start of the Brussels Kaaitheater. He both writes and performs in highly regarded theatre plays such as Larf and Weg (both with music by Peter Vermeersch, and has received many awards for his works, such as the Océ Podium Prize for his entire oeuvre in 2000. He has led theatre companies such as Het Net (Bruges), Victoria (Ghent) and Het Toneelhuis (Antwerp).
With the latter company, he played the main role in "Tenebrous Heart", after Joseph Conrad's novel, performed in Paris in 2011.
Throughout his career he has collaborated with various actors, directors, writers and artists, such as Tom Jansen, Dirk Roofthooft, Luk Perceval, Guy Cassiers, Jan Decorte, Jürgen Gosh, Jan Ritsema, Jan Lauwers, Manu Riche, Peter Vermeersch and FES, Claire Chevallier, George van Dam, Jan Kuijken, Eric Thielemans, Rudy Trouvé, Roland Van Campenhout, Collegium Vocale, I Solisti del Vento and many more.
It is said that from 2017 he will work on a trilogy in collaboration with LODcomposers Dominique Pauwels, Jan Kuijken and Kris Defoort. The first part of the trilogy or "Trifonie"(as called by De Pauw) will be called Heroes (in Dutch: De Helden) and will deal with the theme of heroism and its role in today's society.

Movies

Josse De Pauw starred in his first major movie part in 1989. After that he has played in about 50 movies, among them most of the movies by Belgian director Dominique Deruddere, including Crazy Love, Kaas (Cheese), Hombres Complicados, Wait Until Spring, Bandini and Iedereen Beroemd! (Everybody Famous). This last movie was nominated for Best Foreign Language Film at the 2000 Academy Awards. He played the Ringmaster in Philip Ridley's English-language thriller The Passion of Darkly Noon. De Pauw directed two movies of his own: Vinaya and Übung.

Filmography 
 2019 – Patrick (De Patrick)
 2017 – Cargo
 2016 – Everybody Happy
 2014 – Flying Home
 2006 – Crusade in Jeans (Kruistocht in spijkerbroek)
 2005 – Someone Else's Happiness (Een ander zijn geluk)
 2004 – The Kiss (De kus)
 2004 – 25 degrés en hiver
 2003 – De vreemde Mann
 2001 – Verboden te zuchten
 2000 – Wild Mussels
 2000 – Everybody's Famous! (Iedereen beroemd!)
 1999 – Pour toujours
 1999 – Kaas
 1998 – Hombres Complicados
 1996 – Zwarte sneeuw, TV
 1996 – Jeunesse sans dieu, TV
 1995 – The Passion of Darkly Noon
 1995 – The Flying Dutchman (De vliegende Hollander)
 1995 – Last Call (Hoogste Tijd)
 1994 – Just Friends
 1993 – Aan Zee
 1992 – L’Ordre de jour
 1991 – Toto le héros
 1989 – Wait Until Spring, Bandini
 1987 – Crazy Love
 1986 – De Wisselwachter
 1985 – Wildshut
 1984 – De stille Oceaan

Books

Josse De Pauw has also published two books, consisting of his theatre plays intermingled with popular short stories from daily life: Werk (Work) and Nog (More). Werk was nominated for the Gouden Uil in 2000.

References

External links 
 
 Josse De Pauw, door Jef Aerts en Anne-Marie Van Wijnsberghe 
  Jose De Pauw on LOD

1952 births
Living people
Flemish male stage actors
People from Asse
Flemish male film actors
20th-century Flemish male actors
21st-century Flemish male actors